Reinhard Haupenthal (born 17 February 1945; died 29 September 2016) was a German Esperantist, Volapükist (or Volapükologist), translator, and linguist. Donald J. Harlow described Haupenthal's personal style in a warning to potential readers of Haupenthal's translation of Goethe's Young Werther: "the vocabulary used by Haupenthal is far from standard, and at times the Esperanto verges on the incomprehensible."

References

Literature 

 Menade bal püki bal. Festschrift zum 50. Geburtstag von Reinhard Haupenthal. Festlibro por la 50a naskiĝ-tago de Reinhard Haupenthal. 1995-02-17. Antaŭparolo de Henri Vatré. Saarbrücken: Edition Iltis.

1945 births
2016 deaths
German Esperantists
Linguists from Germany
Volapükologists
Translators of Johann Wolfgang von Goethe